Pheophorbide or phaeophorbide is a product of chlorophyll breakdown and a derivative of pheophytin where both the central magnesium has been removed and the phytol tail has been hydrolyzed. It is used as a photosensitizer in photodynamic therapy.

Pheophorbide may be generated by digestion of ingested plant matter. Both worm (Caenorhabditis elegans) and mouse mitochondria are able to use the molecule in a form of ad hoc photoheterotrophy.

References

Biochemistry
Light therapy
Tetrapyrroles